The Ravenna Cosmography ( "The Cosmography of the Unknown Ravennese") is a list of place-names covering the world from India to Ireland, compiled by an anonymous cleric in Ravenna around 700 AD. Textual evidence indicates that the author frequently used maps as his source.

The text
There are three known copies of the Cosmography in existence. The Vatican Library holds a 14th-century copy, there is a 13th-century copy in Paris at the Bibliothèque Nationale, and the library at Basle University has another 14th-century copy. The Vatican copy was used as the source for the first publication of the manuscript in 1688 by Porcheron. The German scholar Joseph Schnetz published the text in 1940, basing it on the Vatican and Paris editions, which he believed to be more reliable than the Basle edition. Parts of the text, notably that covering Britain, have been published by others, including Richmond and Crawford in 1949, but their document showed little regard for which of the manuscripts provided the information. However, it contained photographs of the relevant sections from all three manuscripts, which enabled Keith Fitzpatrick-Matthews to reconstruct the text from scratch in 2013 (revised in 2020) for his reassessment of its importance for British geography. The work by Schnetz covered the whole document, and was republished in 1990. In addition to the three main manuscripts, the Vatican Library also holds a document containing excerpts from the Cosmography made by Riccobaldus Ferrariensis, and there is a copy of the Paris manuscript held in Leiden.

The surviving texts are quite challenging. They consist of commentary and lists of names. The Vatican manuscript presents the text in two columns, with placenames being capitalised and terminated by a stop. A small number of the words have been abbreviated. The Paris manuscript also uses two columns, capitalisation and stops, but has many more abbreviations than either of the other two. The text is divided into sections by paragraph marks. The Basle manuscript only has a single column, and is more difficult to read than the others. It has more abbreviations than the Vatican copy, but fewer than the Paris copy. There is some evidence that the author has tried to correct or clarify words which were not clear in the original, and there are no stops to separate the place names in the lists, but there are underlined headings to divide up the sections. As an indication of the problems of dealing with the text, there are a total of 315 names in the section covering Britain. All three manuscripts agree on the spelling of 200 of these. The Basle and Vatican documents agree on the spelling of a further 50, there are 33 more common to the Basle and Paris documents, and 17 more which appear in the Paris and Vatican documents. There are 8 names for which there is no agreement between the three sources, and 7 names missing from the Paris copy where the other two agree.

In a paper by Franz Staab, published in 1976, he noted that the original author claimed to have used works by three others, Athanarid, Heldebald and Marcomir, in the compilation of his own work. Stolte, writing in 1956, argued that the cosmography was finished around 732.

British section
The naming of places in Roman Britain has traditionally relied on Ptolemy’s Geography, the Antonine Itinerary and the Peutinger Table, as the Cosmography was seen as full of corruptions, with the ordering of the lists of placenames being haphazard. However, there are more entries in the Cosmography than in the other documents, and so it has been studied more recently. The antiquary Roger Gale, writing in 1709, was the first to attempt to use it as a source for Romano-British place names, but early attempts relied on the similarity between ancient and modern names, and this method was seen to be suspect by the mid-19th century. Archaeological investigations were uncovering sites that had evidence of occupation in the Roman period, and this correlation became important. The Antonine Itinerary and Richard of Cirencester's de Situ Britanniae were increasingly used to corroborate entries, until Richard's work was found to be an 18th-century hoax by Charles Bertram. The Cosmography remained relatively impenetrable until the mid-20th century.

In 1949, Sir Ian Richmond and O G S Crawford published a paper they had originally submitted to Archaeologia, which suggested that the sources for the document had included maps or road books, and that many place names described geographical features. The book was seen as a significant advance in the study both of the document and of Romano-British placenames. Louis Dillemann's work, which was translated by Professor Colin Smith and published in Archaeologia in 1979, was the first time that the theories of J Schnetz had been summarised for an English-speaking audience, while A. L. F. Rivet and Colin Smith used their study of the document to publish The Place-Names of Roman Britain in the same year.

Part of the difficulty with the text is its corruption, which probably results from the author failing to understand his sources, or not appreciating the purpose for which they were written. His original sources may have been of poor quality, resulting in many curious-looking names appearing in the lists. Equally, there are some obvious omissions, although the author was not attempting to produce a complete list of places, as his introduction states: "In that Britain we read that there were many civitates and forts, of which we wish to name a few." The suggestion that he was using maps is bolstered by phrases such as "next to" which occur frequently, and at one point he states: "where that same Britain is seen to be narrowest from Ocean to Ocean." Richmond and Crawford were the first to  argue that rather than being random, the named places are often clustered around a central point, or spread out along a single road. For most of England, the order seems to follow a series of zig-zags, but this arrangement is less obvious for the south-west and for Scotland.

See also
Antonine Itinerary
Guido of Pisa's Geographica
Ptolemy's Geography
Tabula Peutingeriana

External links

The Cosmographia
Ravennatis Anonymi Cosmographia et Gvidonis Geographica (fulltext in Latin) at Archive.org.

Sites dealing with the British section

Sites dealing with the Iberian section 
Ravennatis Anonymi Cosmographia. Introduction in Portuguese and link to an edition of the Latin original.

References

Bibliography

Historic maps of the Roman Empire
8th century maps
7th-century Latin writers
7th-century Byzantine writers
7th-century Byzantine scientists
8th-century Latin books
8th-century Latin writers
8th-century Byzantine writers
8th-century Byzantine scientists
Geography books
History of geography